Newbury Park is a London Underground station in Newbury Park, Ilford, East London. It is between Barkingside and Gants Hill stations on the Hainault loop of the Central line, in Travelcard Zone 4. The station was initially opened by the Great Eastern Railway on 1 May 1903 and subsequently transferred its services to the London & North Eastern Railway due to the amalgamation. Underground trains only started serving the station on 14 December 1947, operating via the Gants Hill tunnel. The line was extended to Hainault on 31 May 1948. The Grade II listed bus shelter designed by Oliver Hill opened on 6 July 1949. Lifts were fully installed at Newbury Park in November 2018 to provide step-free access to the station, approximately 10 years after TfL abandoned the project.

Geography
Newbury Park station is located in Newbury Park (in 1903 known as the Horns) of northeastern Ilford in the London Borough of Redbridge. It was built to serve the growing neighbourhood of Newbury Park where the earliest settlement, Birkbeck Estate, dates back to the 1880s. When Eastern Avenue was completed through Newbury Park as a bypass in 1920, development sprung-up around the area. Nearby landmarks include Oaks Park High School, Aldborough Primary School, St. Theresa Roman Catholic Church, Ilford War Memorial Gardens and Holiday Inn Express Hotel.

Newbury Park station has two car parks; one connects to King George Avenue and the other to Eastern Avenue. Entrance to the station is via the bus shelter.

History
Newbury Park originally opened on 1 May 1903, as part of a Great Eastern Railway (GER) branch line from Woodford to Ilford via Hainault, known as the Fairlop Loop (now known as Hainault loop). This line, designed to stimulate suburban growth, had chequered success. In the 1920s, only areas such as Newbury Park were decently populated. As a consequence of the Railways Act 1921, the GER was merged with other railway companies in 1923 to become part of the London & North Eastern Railway (LNER). A new station building was built by the LNER which replaced the original GER building.

As part of the 1935–1940 "New Works Programme" of the London Passenger Transport Board, the majority of the loop, including the station, was to be transferred to form part of the eastern extensions of the Central line. Although work commenced in 1938, it was suspended upon the outbreak of the Second World War in 1939 and work only recommenced in 1945. This involved the construction of a new tube tunnel from Leytonstone via Redbridge which surfaced at Newbury Park to connect with the lines of the existing Ilford to Woodford branch. During the war, a part of the constructed tunnel system was used as an underground aircraft munitions factory, and was used as an air raid shelter.

Steam train services serving Newbury Park were permanently suspended after 29 November 1947. Electrified Central line passenger services to Central London via Gants Hill finally commenced on 14 December 1947. Lord Ashfield, former chairman of the London Passenger Transport Board, and local dignitaries attended the opening ceremony of the extension. A train crew depot was established on 30 November 1947 but closed on 2 November 1953. In addition, the line beyond, to the new Hainault depot, was electrified for empty train movements. The station ceased to be the temporary terminus of the Central line on 31 May 1948 with passenger services to Hainault station reopened. The surface tracks from Newbury Park to Ilford were severed by the expansion of Ilford Carriage Sheds in 1947, whilst those to Seven Kings were severed in 1956. The former alignment was in a cutting which was filled in and subsequently provided land for allotment gardens and housing. Three road bridges (Vicarage Lane, Benton Road and Wards Road) spanning an apparently missing alignment are the only clues to the old railway.

Goods services used to run from the station via Woodford to Temple Mills, reversed via a turn-back siding south of the station until 1965, and by Underground engineering trains until 1992 when it was finally abandoned. An unelectrified track existed next to the 9 sidings which was a reception track to Barkingside goods yard. With the freight yard closed on 4 October 1965, these were demolished on 12 October 1969.

North of the station, the tracks were rearranged upon transfer to London Underground such that the existing tracks were separated further apart, where the former through eastbound track became a reversing siding, though retaining the connection towards Barkingside, whilst through trains use a track formerly part of the sidings and freight yard built to the west of the running lines. The northern end of the platforms were truncated to facilitate insertion of the points-work for the re-arrangement. Nine stabling sidings were added to the northwest of the station, connected to the westbound track via a flat crossing and another reversing siding in between the through tracks in autumn 1947. These did not last: The Hainault depot having fully opened in 1948, seven sidings were abandoned on 25 September 1949, and were closed and demolished on 30 January 1955. The remaining two were abandoned on 24 January 1966 and demolished on 12 October 1969.

Station features

Newbury Park's most prominent feature is the bus shelter connected to the station entrance, designed by Oliver Hill in 1937, and opened on 6 July 1949. Distinguished by a copper-covered barrel-vaulted roof, the structure is a Grade II listed building and won a Festival of Britain architectural award in 1951. The award was marked by a plaque by the side of the shelter. The LNER station building, which looked very similar to Chigwell (further north on the Loop), was demolished in 1956 to facilitate widening of the adjacent A12 Eastern Avenue. The station features GER insignia just beneath the platform canopies, and has a London Transport canteen adjoining the entrance.

Step-free access
In 2009, because of financial constraints, TfL decided to stop work on a project to provide step-free access at Newbury Park and five other stations, on the grounds that these are relatively quiet stations and some are already one or two stops away from an existing step-free station. £4.6 million was spent on Newbury Park before the project was halted. In 2017, as part of the Mayor of London's plan to increase the number of step-free stations, work recommenced on the project to install a lift to both platforms, with the project scheduled for completion in spring 2019. The lifts' installation works were completed ahead of schedule and became operational in November 2018.

Services and connections

Services

Newbury Park is served by the Central line on the Hainault Loop. The next station westbound is Gants Hill and the next station eastbound is Barkingside. Train frequencies vary throughout the day but generally run every 5 minutes westbound between 05:20 and 23:54 and eastbound between 06:28 and 01:05.

Trains generally run between Hainault and Ealing Broadway, although during service disruptions, trains can also run to West Ruislip. The typical off-peak service, in trains per hour as of 2018 is:
 9tph westbound to Ealing Broadway
 3tph westbound to White City
 9tph eastbound to Hainault, 3 of which continue to Woodford

Trains also terminate here from White City 3 times an hour and use the crossover and siding to re-enter service westbound to White City. The siding is to the north of Newbury Park, accessible from both tracks near the station. Another crossover connects to the northbound track at the other end of the siding.

Night Tube operates through this station on Friday and Saturday nights since August 2016. The typical Night tube service, in trains per hour as of 2018 is:
 3tph eastbound to Hainault
 3tph westbound to White City

Connections
London Buses routes 66, 296 and 396 serve the station directly. Route 296 operates 24 hours on Friday and Saturday nights.

Notes and references

Notes

References

Books

External links

 – Bus Station shortly after opening

Tube stations in the London Borough of Redbridge
Former Great Eastern Railway stations
Railway stations in Great Britain opened in 1903
Central line (London Underground) stations
London Underground Night Tube stations
Grade II listed buildings in the London Borough of Redbridge
Grade II listed railway stations
Oliver Hill (architect) buildings
William Neville Ashbee railway stations